Bonaventura Radonić (12 February 1888 – 1945) was a Croatian Franciscan, philosopher, Catholic priest and professor. He was executed by Yugoslav Partisans in 1945.

Biography 
He was born in Kotezi in Vrgorac on 12 February 1888. He attended classical gymnasium in Sinj and studied philosophy in Šibenik. He attended novitiate on Visovac island and was ordained in 1914. Two years later, he went in Innsbruck and Fribourg to further his education, after which he became a high school teacher in Sinj.

From 1936 to 1944 he was theology professor in Makarska. He was supporter of Croatian Peasant Party. In 1944 he went to Zagreb. Following the fall of Independent State of Croatia, he sought refuge in  Slovenia and Austria, where soldiers of British Army returned him back in Slovenia. He was hidden in Maribor alongside a group of Franciscans in local Franciscan monastery. He was soon uncovered and Yugoslav Partisan imprisoned him in Zagreb. On 9 July 1945 he was sentenced to death.

References 

1888 births
1945 deaths
People from Vrgorac
Croatian Franciscans
20th-century Croatian philosophers
Croatian academics
20th-century Croatian Roman Catholic priests
People killed by Yugoslav Partisans
Executed Yugoslav people